Swiss hotelier and tourism entrepreneur Caspar Badrutt (1848–1904) was almost singlehandedly responsible for the origin of several modern winter sporting activities. These began when he sought to provide opportunities fun and frolic on the picturesque but cold slopes outside his first hotel in St Moritz, Switzerland.

St. Moritz in the 19th century was known as a summer mineral spa town where the rich and royal took mineral cures during the months of May through September. However, Badrutt was discontent with having two thirds of the year without guests.

So, at the end of one season, Badrutt challenged some of his well-to-do English regulars to a bet: he would give them lodging for free if they found the locale inhospitable and uninteresting during a lengthy winter stay. Otherwise, if he won their satisfaction, the guests would have to talk up the experience amongst their acquaintances for all of the following year. The men were well connected among the aristocracy of the day, including many scions of royal lines and other European nobles.

Almost overnight, wintering in St Moritz at Badrutt's Kulm hotel became the rage, and increased crowding led to a search for diversions. Beginning in the 1870s, some Englishmen adapted a type of delivery sled for daring dashes down twisting narrow streets of St. Moritz. Subsequently, other tourists wanted a Victorian ride, and larger steerable devices were contrived: the early luge/skeleton individual sleds, and the bobsleigh (or bobsled).

Careening around the town's streets became increasingly popular, but the incidence and frequency of pedestrian collisions and risk to life grew proportionately. Therefore, Badrutt stepped in and created the first purpose-built half-pipe track, now familiar from the Winter Olympic Games. This track later became the model for the Cresta Run skeleton racing track, built in 1884.

External links

Swiss hoteliers
1848 births
1904 deaths